Jeff Watson (March 26, 1973 – November 8, 2020) was a Canadian game designer, writer, and educator. His principal topics of interest were pervasive and environmental game design, creative process design, and participatory media. He served as an assistant professor of interactive media and games at the USC School of Cinematic Arts, was an associate faculty member with the USC Game Innovation Lab, and directed (with Stuart Candy) the Situation Lab.

Biography 
Watson was born in Calgary, Alberta. He attended McGill University in Montreal, York University and the Canadian Film Centre in Toronto, and the University of Southern California in Los Angeles, where he received his PhD (2011) in media arts and practice. His dissertation project, Reality Ends Here, won the 2012 Impact Award at the  IndieCade International Festival of Independent Games. From 2013 to 2014, Watson was an assistant professor in the Digital Futures program at OCAD University in Toronto, where he founded the Situation Lab with futurist Stuart Candy. In 2014, the Situation Lab released its highly influential first game, The Thing From The Future.

Watson died in November 2020 following a battle with cancer. It is unknown whether Reality Ends Here is still active.

Awards 

 Most Significant Futures Work Award (2015) for The Thing From The Future, Association of Professional Futurists
 Impact Award (2012) for Reality Ends Here, IndieCade International Festival of Independent Games

References

External links 
 remotedevice.net – Design portfolio and research blog
 situationlab.org – Research lab
 gameinnovationlab.com – Affiliated research lab
 cinema.usc.edu – USC Cinematic Arts faculty profile page

1973 births
Academic staff of OCAD University
Canadian non-fiction writers
Video game researchers
University of Southern California faculty
Writers from Calgary
2020 deaths